Barbara Weathers (born December 7, 1963) is an American R&B/soul singer, and former lead singer of R&B vocal group, Atlantic Starr.

Overview
Weathers  joined up at the age of 13 with an R&B band known as Covacus. This band was from her native area of Greensboro, North Carolina. In 1984, she left Covacus to join Atlantic Starr, replacing female co-lead singer Sharon Bryant, who had embarked upon a solo career.

Weathers' arrival heralded a new era of mainstream success for Atlantic Starr, beginning with her debut on the 1985 album As the Band Turns. A song from the album, "Secret Lovers", reached No. 3 on the US Billboard Hot 100 chart (becoming the band's first major Hot 100 hit), No. 1 on the Adult Contemporary Songs chart, and No. 4 on the Billboard Hot R&B Songs chart. The album spun off four additional top-40 singles on the Billboard Hot R&B Songs chart, including two other top tens- the debut single "Freak-A-Ristic", which shot to No. 6, and "If Your Heart Isn't In It", which matched "Secret Lovers"' placement at No. 4. Another of these R&B top-40 songs, the R&B No. 12 hit "Silver Shadow" featured Weathers as the sole lead vocalist, her first such song with the group.  As the Band Turns was eventually certified Gold in the US by the RIAA.

Meanwhile, Weathers continued contributing to Atlantic Starr's success, singing on the band's 1987 follow-up album All In The Name Of Love. Spearheaded by the single "Always", a chart-topper on the Pop, R&B, and Adult Contemporary charts, this album surpassed its predecessor, earning RIAA Platinum certification in the US. Follow-up singles from the album included another R&B top ten hit, "One Lover at a Time", also featuring Weathers as the sole lead vocalist.

Following the massive popularity of this album, Weathers left the group to pursue a solo career, going on to release her debut solo album in 1990 on Reprise Records. The LP got to No. 18 on the UK Blues & Soul Hiplist chart. Music & Media called the LP "a big, squeaky clean production" with "a singer of charm and variety in Weathers". People also noted the album as "an attractive and smooth collection". While the album was not as successful in America, the album cut "The Master Key" rose to no. 13 upon the US Billboard Hot R&B Singles chart.

She later appeared on Big Daddy Kane's October 1990 LP Taste of Chocolate and Paul Jackson Jr.'s 1993 album A River in the Desert.

Weathers's 1995 sophomore LP entitled Seeing for the Very First Time was issued solely in Japan. During October 2011, she released Satisfaction Guaranteed, her third studio album.

Weathers is also a member of jazz saxophonist Kirk Whalum's band.

Discography

Albums

With Atlantic Starr
As the Band Turns (1985)
All in the Name of Love (1987)

SoloBarbara Weathers (1990)Seeing For The Very First Time (Weberworks, 1995) Satisfaction Guaranteed'' (Weberworks, 2011)

Singles

With Atlantic Starr
1985
"Freak-A-Ristic"
"Cool, Calm, Collected"
"Silver Shadow"
"Secret Lovers"
1986
"If Your Heart Isn't In It"
"Armed and Dangerous" 1986
1987
"Always" 
"One Lover at A Time" 
"All in the Name of Love" 
1988
"Thankful"

Solo
1990
The Master Key
Our Love Will Last Forever

References

1963 births
American rhythm and blues singers
Living people
Reprise Records artists
Atlantic Starr members
African-American women singers
20th-century American singers
21st-century American singers
20th-century American women singers
21st-century American women singers